Blind Witness is a 1989 American made-for-television thriller drama film  starring Victoria Principal, Paul Le Mat and Stephen Macht. It was set and filmed in Salt Lake City, Utah and broadcast on ABC on November 26, 1989.

Plot
Maggie Kemlich is a blind woman who leads an active, independent life despite her disability. Maggie witnesses robbers murder her husband, Gordon, using a stun gun. However, with the exception of Det. Mike Tuthill, police dismiss her observations due to the fact that she is blind. Police arrest the men who they believe committed the murder, but Maggie goes public with the fact that she believes they have the wrong men, prompting the murderers to come after her. She then seeks out to identify the true killers, and sets up a trap to enact revenge.

Det. Mike Tuthill shows up at Maggie's loft to check on her, but Maggie knocks him unconscious, believing him to be one of the killers. The killers show up at Maggie's loft shortly thereafter, and she traps them in the elevator, temporarily blinds them using high intensity camera lights, and shocks them with a stun gun. One of the killers, Remy, escapes the elevator and attacks Maggie, but she shoots him using Det. Tuthill's gun. Still alive, Remy tricks Maggie into wasting bullets by throwing items in various directions. Det. Tuthill regains consciousness and fights Remy, but Remy pins him to the ground and chokes him with a pipe. Tuthill tells Maggie that the killer is on top of him and to shoot. Maggie hesitates, fearing that she will hit Tuthill, but does shoot, hitting Remy and killing him.

Cast
 Victoria Principal ... Maggie Kemlich
 Paul Le Mat ... Det. Mike Tuthill
 Stephen Macht ... Gordon Kemlich
 Matt Clark ... Lt. Schapper
 Tim Choate ... Remy
 Marcia Reider ... Joanna
 Jeff Olson ... D.J.
 Jesse Bennett ... Langevine
 Dennis Saylor ... Dickie
 Russ McGinn ... Contractor
 Donré Sampson ... Don Lambert
 Jayne Luke ... Dr. Gilroy
 Will C. Hazlett ... Lab Detective
 Joshua Devane ... Wiggins
 J. Omar Hansen ... Lab Cop

References

External links

1989 television films
1989 films
1980s thriller drama films
American thriller drama films
Films shot in Salt Lake City
Films directed by Richard A. Colla
American thriller television films
1980s English-language films
American drama television films
1980s American films